Two destroyers of the British Royal Navy have been named HMS Lookout.

 The first , a  destroyer, was in service 1914–1922.
 The second  was in service 1940–1948.

Royal Navy ship names